The Ministry of Defence is governmental body in Nepal that formulates defence policies and coordinates defence affairs with other agencies of the government and the Nepalese Armed Forces.

Origin
The origin and evolution of the defence administration of modern Nepal dates back to the unification of Nepal in 1770. From the foundation to until popular movement, the defence administration was directly overseen by the Crown itself.

Before 1950, there was no division of duties between the Ministry and the Army headquarters. The Commander-in Chief and the Senior Commanding General between themselves dealt with the whole range of administration and policy regarding defence. For the first time in the history of Nepal, a separate ministry by the name of Defence Ministry was set up in the interim Government of 1950 headed by Prime Minister Mohan Shumsher. The first Defence Minister was Babar Shumsher . The organizational structure of the Defence Ministry at the time was quite simple having only two branches, Viz. (i) General and (ii) Budget. The Ministry had a secretary, two deputy secretaries, and two assistant secretaries. Since then the ministry has undergone continuous evolution and assumed the present structure.

The Ministry of Defence was established to protect and defend the nation and the people from internal instability and external threats by ensuring the sovereignty, national independence and integrity of the country.

Functions

According to Business (Allocation) Regulation 2063, the Ministry of Defense is responsible for following functions:

overcome the threat of border
 Organization and control of the Nepalese Army
 Coordination of Military Training
 Oversight of Military Welfare
 Procurement and Production of military hardware
 Oversight of military activities and military operations
 Oversight and coordination of military construction
 Development of Military academy, installation, communication and transport
 Provision of Military storage
 Enhancement of Military Intelligence capabilities
 Development and establishment of Military Hospitals
 Establishment and Management of Military barracks and offices
 Coordination and direction of military assistance in natural calamities and development
 Organization, Training and Administration of the National Cadet Corps
 Welfare of Retired Military Personnel
 Oversight, establishment and coordination of National Parks and Wildlife reserves
 Provision and procurement of military aircraft
 Welfare schemes
 Coordination with the National Security Council (NSC)

Objective
Ministry of Defence is established as per Government of Nepal Business Allocation Rules, 2069 (2012) with the objective of managing and operating national defence affairs. The Ministry is responsible for maintaining internal as well as external security in order to safeguard the national sovereignty and territorial integrity. Besides its primary responsibility of external security, it is also responsible for maintaining internal law and order by protecting the lives and properties of the people as per the derisory of the government . In this context the principal task of the Defence Ministry is to make policy directions on defence and security matters and communicate them for implementation to the Nepalese Army and its various service departments. Besides, the MoD also acts as a liaison or contact point for communication and interaction for Nepal Army with other Ministries and Departments.

Former Ministers of Defence  

This is a list of all ministers of Defense since the Nepalese Constituent Assembly election in 2013:

References

Defence
Nepal